Ninjasonik are a Brooklyn-based rap duo composed of frontman Telli and DJ-turned-vocalist Jah-Jah.

Biography 

Ninjasonik started in late 2006-early 2007  when fellow DJ's Jah Jah Brown and Kevin Ross began writing and recording songs in Bushwick, NY.  The original songs were best described as sarcastic incantations which lyrically played with themes like pregnancy and racial identities. The tunes were sung over beats similar to Baltimore Club Music. In mid-2007, they released a mixtape which featured a handful of original songs mixed with various other tracks.  The most recognizable of their songs was "Tight Pants", a song which aggressively shouted about being black and wearing tight pants, a taboo idea at the time (since hip hop and black culture emphasized baggy pants at the time).  The song quickly gained recognition within segments of the New York club and indie rock scenes. In fall 2007, the group produced a YouTube music video for "Tight Pants"  and it went viral.  Shortly after that, Kevin met Michael Ratcliffe (a.k.a. Telli Gramz) at a bar in Brooklyn and invited him to record a rap verse on a remix of the song. Telli soon joined the group. Between 2007-2010, the group toured and performed nationally and internationally and released several more mixtapes and albums.  In summer 2010, DJ Teenwolf left the group.  Jah Jah and Telli continue to perform and record under the Ninjasonik moniker

Ninjasonik are native New Yorkers: Telli grew up in the Crown Heights area of Brooklyn while Jah-Jah was born and raised in The Bronx. Their music combines elements of hip-hop, electro and punk. Their latest release No Sword Or Masks landed on Decon Records on July 27, 2011 and featured a guest appearance from Theophilus London.

Discography

Albums

Singles

References

African-American musical groups
American musical duos
Hip hop duos
Hip hop groups from New York City